James Penman (born 26 May 1896, date of death unknown) was a Scottish footballer who played as a defender.

External links
 LFC History profile

1896 births
Year of death missing
Scottish footballers
Liverpool F.C. players
Place of birth missing
Association football defenders